Pinhas Inbari is an Israeli correspondent who has reported on Palestinian affairs for Israel Radio and the newspaper Al Hamishmar, and currently for the Jerusalem Center for Public Affairs and several foreign media outlets. He has written several books and articles on the Palestinians, e.g. The Palestinians: Between Terrorism and Statehood.

References

Israeli journalists
Living people
Year of birth missing (living people)